Long Nights Short Mornings is a 2016 American romantic drama film starring Shiloh Fernandez.  An examination of the romantic life of a young man in New York City and his sometimes fleeting, sometimes profound experiences with the women he encounters.

Cast
Shiloh Fernandez as James
Addison Timlin as Rapunzel
Natalia Dyer as Marie
Stella Maeve as Lily
Paten Hughes as Monica
Helen Rogers as Lorraine
Ella Rae Peck as Katie
Christine Evangelista as Natalie
Cassandra Freeman as Anna

References

External links
 
 

American romantic drama films
Films set in New York (state)
Films set in New York City
2016 romantic drama films
2010s English-language films
2010s American films